Abdel Sattar Abdel Hadj (born 1936) is an Egyptian rower. He competed in the 1960 Summer Olympics in the men's eight event.

References

External links 
 
 

1936 births
Living people
Rowers at the 1960 Summer Olympics
Egyptian male rowers
Olympic rowers of Egypt